The Spaniards Inn is a historic pub on Spaniards Road between Hampstead and Highgate in London, England. It lies on the edge of Hampstead Heath near Kenwood House. It is a Grade II listed building, dating back to the 16th century.

History
The pub is believed to have been built in 1585 on the Finchley boundary, with the tavern forming the entrance to the Bishop of London's estate—an original boundary stone from 1755 can still be seen in the front garden. Opposite it there is a toll house built in around 1710. Today, the pub is in Barnet and the tollhouse is in Camden, both are now listed buildings and traffic is reduced to one lane between the two. A suggestion in 1966 to demolish the tollhouse was successfully resisted, partly on the grounds that it would lead to more and faster traffic.

Dick Turpin is thought to have been a regular at the Inn, as his father had been its landlord. What is certain is that highwaymen frequented this area and likely used the Inn to watch the road; at that time the Inn was around two hours from London by coach and the area had its fair share of wealthy travellers. Records from the Old Bailey show that on 16 October 1751 Samuel Bacon was indicted for robbery on the King's Highway and was caught 200 yards from the Spaniards.

In 1780 rioters involved in the Gordon Riots, opposed to the relaxation of laws in England that restricted Catholicism, marched on Hampstead intent on attacking Kenwood House, the home of William Murray, 1st Earl of Mansfield. The landlord of the Spaniards at the time is reported to have given them free drinks, keeping the rioters occupied, until the local militia arrived, thus saving the house.

In literature
The pub is mentioned in Dickens's The Pickwick Papers and Bram Stoker's Dracula, and was frequented by the artist Joshua Reynolds and the poets Byron and Keats. According to the pub, Keats wrote his Ode to a Nightingale in the gardens, and Stoker borrowed one of their resident ghost stories to furnish the plot of Dracula.

Food 
In 2007, The Spaniards Inn was listed in 4th place by The Guardian in an article detailing the "Top 10 UK pub roasts". It was also listed by The Guardian as one of Britain's Best Pubs in 2009.

References

External links 
 
 Spaniards Inn – article in BBC's H2G2 with more on history and atmosphere of the pub.

Buildings and structures completed in 1585
Grade II listed pubs in London
Grade II listed buildings in the London Borough of Barnet
Buildings and structures in Hampstead
Pubs in the London Borough of Barnet